Expedition Impossible is a 2011 American reality television series. The series follows thirteen teams of three competitors as they "solve problems while racing across deserts, over mountains and through rivers" across the nation of Morocco. The first team to cross the finish line after completing the ten stages of the competition was to receive US$150,000. In addition, each team member won a new Ford Explorer.

Created by producer Mark Burnett and hosted by wildlife expert Dave Salmoni, the series premiered on ABC on June 23, 2011, to mild critical response. The show was canceled following its first and only season.

Game
Expedition Impossible is run in ten stages, each of which has a series of checkpoints. At each checkpoint, teams receive instructions on how to reach the next checkpoint and at some checkpoints they face challenges that must be completed before heading to the next checkpoint. The last team in each stage to reach the final checkpoint is eliminated. If any member of a team quits, the team is eliminated.

The competition began in Merzouga and concluded in Marrakech, covering a course of around 2,000 miles including treks through the Sahara Desert and over the Atlas Mountains.

Production
ABC and producer Mark Burnett announced the series on November 4, 2010, with Burnett describing Expedition Impossible as "high adventure television" and "an epic Indiana Jones-style experience". Open casting began later that month. Prospective contestants were required to demonstrate proficiency in several skills, including horseback riding, righting a boat that had been capsized, compass reading and rappelling.

After initially announcing a premiere date of June 21, 2011, ABC revised the date to June 23.

International distribution and adaptations
On May 9, 2011, CTV Television Network announced that it had acquired Expedition Impossible for Canadian broadcast and that it would debut the series on June 21. CTV pushed back the premiere to the 23rd, corresponding with its American debut.

On July 16, 2011, Australia's Network Ten started to broadcast the show in the 6:30pm – 7:30pm timeslot on its main channel - 10.

An adaptation of the series premiered on the channel Cuatro in Spain on January 23, 2013. Hosted by Raquel Sánchez-Silva, Expedición Imposible features ten pairs of celebrities racing through Morocco.

Teams

The Gypsies
John Post, 25, Pensacola Beach, FL. Sustainable Farmer  Taylor Filasky, 31, San Diego, CA. Video Producer  Eric Bach, 26, San Francisco, CA. Entrepreneur

Group of friends that, collectively, have traveled to over 40 countries.

No Limits 
Erik Weihenmayer, 42, Golden, CO. Motivational Speaker/Writer  Jeff Evans, 41, Boulder, CO. Motivational Speaker/Physician Assistant  Aaron "Ike" Isaacson, 33, Topeka, KS. Soldier

Jeff is Erik's climbing guide on mountaineering expeditions because Erik is blind. Ike is a soldier.

Fab 3
Ryan Allen Carrillo, 36, Los Angeles, CA. Unemployed  Kari Gibson, 26, Los Angeles, CA. Model  AJ Gibson, 30, Los Angeles, CA. Mortgage Consultant

Kari and AJ are siblings. Ryan and AJ used to be a couple, but are now friends. All three are roommates.

The Football Players
Akbar Gbaja-Biamila, 31, Los Angeles, CA. Broadcaster  Robert Ortiz, 27, Solana Beach, CA. Business Owner  Ricky Sharpe, 31, Costa Mesa, CA. Health and Fitness Consultant

All three are former professional football players who first met while playing for San Diego State University.

The Cops
Robert "Rob" Robillard, 43, Concord, MA. Police Lieutenant  Dani Henderson, 34, Marlborough, MA. Police Officer  James "Jim" Vaglica, 49, Billerica, MA. Police Sergeant

Cops who work together. In 2016, Jim Vaglica of The Cops would appear on the FOX reality show, American Grit.

California Girls 
Christina Chin, 24, Davis, CA. Corporate PR.  Brittany Smith, 24, Rancho Murieta, CA. Aspiring Pro Golfer  Natalie Smith, 25, Woodland, CA. Teacher/Coach

Friends who met while attending the University of California, Davis.

The Country Boys 
Nicholas Coughlin, 28, Clinton, MS. Internet Marketing/Entrepreneur  Jason Cronin, 37, Pensacola Beach, FL. Business Owner/Entrepreneur  Chad Robinson, 27, Bolton, MS. Real Estate Investor

Friends coming from Mississippi and nearby.

The Fishermen 
Gus Sanfilippo, 48, Gloucester, MA. Fisherman  Nino Sanfilippo, 43, Gloucester, MA. Fisherman  Joe Sanfilippo, 44, Gloucester, MA. Fisherman

Gus and Nino are brothers and Joe is their cousin. All three are crew on the fishing boat Captain Dominic.

New York Firemen 
Kevin "Fathead" Coursey, 39, Belle Harbor, NY. Firefighter  Rob Keiley, 34, Rockaway Park, NY. Firefighter  Mike Egan, 34, Rockaway Park, NY. Firefighter

Co-workers who are firefighters in New York

Team Kansas 
Lindsey Haymond, 27, Houston, TX. Teacher  Kelsey Fuller, 22, Overland Park, KS. Student  Mackenzie Fuller, 18, Overland Park, KS. Student

Three sisters who are originally from Kansas.

Grandpa's Warriors 
Dick Smith, 69, Normal, IL. Store Owner  Steven Smith, 48, Savoy, IL. Store Owner  Samantha Smith-Gibbs, 23, Thomasboro, IL. Store Manager

Samantha is Steven's daughter, Dick is Steven's father.

Mom's Army 
Eleanor "Ellie" Vanderbeck, 52, Reading, PA. Bookkeeper  Ruthie Vanderbeck, 28, Reading, PA. Realtor  Abbie Vanderbeck, 30, Norwalk, CT. Nanny

Ruthie and Abbie are Ellie's daughters. They were also in the military.

Latin Persuasion 
Dashia Imperiale, 44, New York, NY. Fitness Instructor  Raven Garcia, 30, Bronx, NY. Freelance Writer  Mai Reyes, 38, New York, NY. Manager

Friends and co-workers, all with Latino heritage.

Progress

A  team placement means the team was eliminated.
A  team placement means the team won the expedition.

Stages

Reception
Before its debut, Expedition Impossible drew comparisons to other reality television series, including The Amazing Race, Pirate Master, and Burnett's own adventure race series Eco-Challenge. Burnett has repudiated the comparisons to TAR, saying "There’s no taxis. There’s no hotels. This is very, very different. Here, you actually need to put yourself on the line, really be willing to cross the deserts and the mountains and use the camels and the horses. So, it’s a very, very much more difficult competition."

David Hinckley of The New York Daily News found the premiere to follow a familiar formula and wondered whether a "saturation point" for this style of entertainment had been reached. In saying so, he stressed that he in no way was diminishing the accomplishments of the participating teams. Similarly, Brian Lowry for Variety, while calling the series a "transparent knockoff of The Amazing Race", complimented Burnett on his ability to create "a sense of jeopardy in the challenges" while finding that the series as a whole "travels such a familiar course" that it was tantamount to "recycling" the concepts of other series.

Expedition Impossible was the top-rated program the night of its debut, pulling 2.4/7 in adults 18/49 and 7.18 million viewers. The premiere was the 8th most watched show that week. In the second episode, Expedition Impossible pulled a 1.8/6 in adults 18/49 and 6.16 million viewers. This drop was not unusual for a holiday weekend, as other shows also experienced a rating decline. Despite this, Expedition Impossible was the top rated program of the hour and the second top rated program of the night, as well as the 12th most watched show that week in the 18/49 demo.  Ratings however continued to slip when its fifth episode only garnered a rating of 1.3 for the 18/49 demo and 4.68 million in total viewers. The show hit a season low for its eighth episode, with a demo rating of 1.1 and only watched by 3.83 million viewers. The show's ninth episode was watched by 4.45 million viewers, and the season finale ended with a rating of 1.3 for the 18/49 demo and 4.61 millions in total viewer number.

International versions 
The TV format was exported in Spain with the title Expedición Imposible when it was aired on Cuatro and hosted by Raquel Sánchez Silva on 2013.

References

External links
 Official site

2010s American reality television series
2011 American television series debuts
2011 American television series endings
American Broadcasting Company original programming
Television series by MGM Television
Television series created by Mark Burnett
Television shows filmed in Morocco
Television shows set in Morocco